Angus Taylor may refer to:

 Angus Taylor (politician) (born 1966), Australian politician
 Angus Ellis Taylor (1911–1999), mathematician